Veazie is an unincorporated community in King County, in the U.S. state of Washington.

History
A post office called Veazie was established in 1890, and remained in operation until 1892. The community was named after Thomas Veazie, a businessperson in the logging industry.

References

Unincorporated communities in King County, Washington
Unincorporated communities in Washington (state)